Mansoura University was founded in 1972 in Mansoura city, Egypt. It is in the middle of the Nile Delta. It is one of the biggest Egyptian universities and has contributed much to the cultural and scientific life in Mansoura and Egypt.

History
The faculty of medicine was founded in 1962 as a branch of Cairo University. In 1972, a presidential decree announced the establishment of the university under the name "East Delta University". Its name was changed to Mansoura University in 1973.

In 2018, the Mansourasaurus, a genus of herbivorous lithostrotian sauropod dinosaur, had been discovered by a team under Mansoura University paleontologist Hesham Sallam and was named after the university.

Ranking 

According to Times Higher Education (THE) (Edition: 2020), the ranking of Mansoura University is:
 World Ranking: 401–500
 Egyptian Ranking: 2

Faculties and institutes 
The Faculty of Computers and Information Sciences
The Faculty of Engineering
The Faculty of Science
The Faculty of Agriculture 
The Faculty of Arts
The Faculty of Commerce
The Faculty of Dental Medicine
The Faculty of Law
The Faculty of Medicine
The Faculty of Pharmacy & Clinical Pharmacy
The Faculty of Tourism and Hotels
The Faculty of Veterinary Medicine
The Faculty of Nursing
The Faculty of Physical Education
The Faculty of Kindergarten
The Faculty of Specific Education
Technical Institute of Nursing
The Faculty of Media Literature
The Faculty of Fine Arts

Hospitals and medical centers 
Urology and Nephrology Center
Specialized Medical Hospital
Gastroenterology Surgical Center
Mansoura University Hospitals
Emergency Hospital
Mansoura University Children's Hospital
Oncology Center
Ophthalmic Center
Medical Experimental Research Center (MERC)

Special centers and units 
Communication and Information Technology Center
Water Sanitary Drainage and Industrial Projects Center
Engineering Studies Research and Consultancies Center
Technical Laboratory Scientific Services Center
Information, Documentation and Decision Support Center
Values Studies and Nationals Affiliation Center
Managerial Training & Consulting Center
Scientific Computing Center (SCC)
Public Service Center
Mansoura University Nanotechnology Center
Mansoura University Staff Club
English for Specific Purposes Center (ESPC)
Childhood Care Development Center
Arabic Language Learning Center for non-native speakers
Elearning Unit (ELU)
UNIVERSITY CENTERS FOR CAREER DEVELOPMENT
Glass Research Group

Notable alumni and faculty members

Mohamed Ghoneim
Hamdy Doweidar
Ayman Nour
Khairat el-Shater
Mohamed Mansi Qandil
Hesham Salam
Farha Elshenawey

References

External links 
 Mansoura University official website

 
Universities in Egypt
1972 establishments in Egypt
Educational institutions established in 1972